Nadine Madeleine Martina Kirschon (born 19 March 1984 in Stockholm) is a Swedish actress. Kirschon won Best Actress 2005 at the GAFFA - International Film Festival for Young People in Austria in 2005 for her role in Bombay Dreams (film). And winner of Guldkappan in 2003 for her role as Hanna in Love boogie.

Selected filmography
Livet i Fagervik
Hotell Kantarell
Beck – Den svaga länken
Göta kanal 2 - kanalkampen
Mon 3
 Jullovsmorgon (2005/2006)
Bombay Dreams (film) - Camilla  *Best Actress 2005, Nadine Kirschon, GAFFA - International Film Festival for Young People, Wien, Austria
Olivia Twist
Love boogie - Hanna * Winner Guldklappan 2003
En ängels tålamod
En klass för sig
Dubbel-8 - Angelika

References

External links
Official website

Swedish Film Database

Swedish actresses
1984 births
Living people
Actresses from Stockholm